Gottlieb Taschler (born 21 August 1961) is a former Italian biathlete. He competed at the 1984, 1988 and 1992 Winter Olympics. Currently he is a Vice-President of the International Biathlon Union.

At the 1984 Winter Olympics in Sarajevo, he finished 5th in the 4 × 7.5 km relay with the Italian team. At the 1988 Winter Olympics in Calgary, he won a bronze medal in the relay, and finished 11th in the 20 km individual.

In 2010 he contacted doping doctor Michele Ferrari to set up a meeting with his son Daniel Taschler. Wiretaps show that his son then acquired EPO from Dr. Ferrari.

Biathlon results
All results are sourced from the International Biathlon Union.

Olympic Games
1 medal (1 bronze)

World Championships
2 medals (1 gold, 1 bronze)

*During Olympic seasons competitions are only held for those events not included in the Olympic program.
**Team was added as an event in 1989.

Further notable results
 1983: 3rd, Italian championships of biathlon
 1986: 2nd, Italian championships of biathlon
 1987: 3rd, Italian championships of biathlon
 1988: 3rd, Italian championships of biathlon

References

External links
 

1961 births
Living people
People from Rasen-Antholz
Germanophone Italian people
Italian male biathletes
Biathletes at the 1984 Winter Olympics
Biathletes at the 1988 Winter Olympics
Biathletes at the 1992 Winter Olympics
Olympic biathletes of Italy
Medalists at the 1988 Winter Olympics
Olympic medalists in biathlon
Olympic bronze medalists for Italy
Biathlon World Championships medalists
Biathletes of Fiamme Gialle
Sportspeople from Südtirol